A  joy buzzer (also called a  hand buzzer) is a practical joke device that consists of a coiled spring inside a disc worn in the palm of the hand. When the wearer shakes hands with another person, a button on the disc releases the spring, which rapidly unwinds creating a vibration which mimics an electric shock to the unsuspecting victim.

History
The joy buzzer was invented in 1928 by Soren Sorensen "Sam" Adams of the S.S. Adams Co.  It was modeled after The Zapper a product that was similar to the joy buzzer, but did not have a very effective buzz and contained a button with a blunt point which would hurt the recipient's hand.

Adams brought a large prototype of his newly designed buzzer to Dresden, Germany, where a machinist created the tools that would make the parts for a new palm-sized Joy Buzzer. In 1932, the item received  from the U.S. Patent Office. The instant success of the new item allowed Adams to move to a new building and increase the size of his company.  Adams continued to send royalty payments to the tool and die maker until 1934 when the payments were returned.

In 1987, Sam Adams son, Joseph "Bud" Adams, redesigned the mechanism for greater durability and a louder buzz, marketing it as the Super Joy Buzzer.

Electric shock
A common misconception, largely due to false advertising by the makers of the device, is that the joy buzzer delivers an electric shock, when in fact it only causes a vibration simulating a shock.

In pop culture
The joy buzzer has found its way into several pop culture media since its creation. Some stylized villains in fiction (e.g. Batman's nemesis The Joker) employ "lethally powerful" joy buzzers as weapons. In Walt Disney's Mickey Mouse cartoon film Mickey's Rival (1936), Mickey Mouse's hands are shocked by Mortimer Mouse's trousers. In the SpongeBob SquarePants episode "Pranks a Lot" (2004), Patrick Star's hand is shocked by a joy buzzer. In The Simpsons episode "Homie the Clown" (1995), Homer Simpson is shocked with a joy buzzer multiple times by Krusty the Clown to the point where he is tortured by it. Two years later it makes another appearance in "Principal and the Pauper" (1997) where Bart used it on Principal Seymour Skinner promoting the reply "What the... Oh an enjoyment buzzer!".

Related device variations 
Some device variations were later created to actually shock the person being pranked rather than simulate the shock with vibrations. These devices include the shocking pen which generates a mild electric shock when a victim clicks the button on top or shocking gum which also delivers a mild electric shock when a victim touches or pulls upon what appears to be the last stick of gum from a box.

See also
Chinese finger trap
Whoopee cushion
Snake nut can
Chewing gum bug 
Fake vomit
 List of practical joke topics

References

Practical joke devices